Steinhausen is a railway station in the Swiss canton of Zug, situated in the municipality of Steinhausen. The station is located on the Zurich to Zug via Affoltern am Albis railway line and is an intermediate stop on Zurich S-Bahn line S5.

References

External links 
 

Railway stations in the canton of Zug
Swiss Federal Railways stations
Railway stations in Switzerland opened in 1904